Luknė is a feminine given name of Lithuanian origin. It was the seventh most popular name for newborn girls in Lithuania in 2021 and the third most used name for newborn girls there in 2022. The Etymological Dictionary of Lithuanian language associates the word with the Slavic term for water lily, with the proto-Slavic roots luk- for bend and lug- for swamp or meadow, and  some other hypotheses.

Notes

Lithuanian feminine given names